Lake Langdon in Mound, Minnesota, has an area of . It is named for R. V. Langdon, the first township clerk. It is located west of Commerce Boulevard and south of Lynwood Boulevard. Boats on the lake cannot navigate to the nearby Lake Minnetonka, though it overflows into Lost Lake, part of the Big Lake, through Langdon Bay Creek. It also serves as an outlet for Saunders Lake, to its west. The lake has a watershed area to surface area ratio of 6.5:1, meaning that it drains an area about 6½ times its size.

The lake (or bay as it is sometimes called) has an over abundance of phosphorus, that probably resulted from it being downstream from Mound's old sewer plant. The plant closed back in the late 1970s. Phosphorus is a catalyst that can contribute to excessive plant growth. Though the lake's MCWD Report Card shows a significant drop off of the phosphorus levels over the past 20 years, it is still a problem. A higher outflow from Langdon could lower the phosphorus level, but its water clarity remains poor, despite the fact that it was treated with Alum in 1998.

Wildlife

Fish in the lake include bass, crappies, sunfish, and numerous carp and catfish. During the warmer months, Blue Heron and White Egrets fish the shoreline. Beavers are present on the western part of the bay as evidenced by the downed trees.

See also
Eutrophication - problems with Phosphorus

References

External links

Lakes of Hennepin County, Minnesota
Lakes of Minnesota